Chotyze  is a village in the administrative district of Gmina Ciepielów, within Lipsko County, Masovian Voivodeship, in east-central Poland.

The village has a population of 210.

References

Chotyze